Hoffmeyer is a surname. Notable people with the surname include:

Bob Hoffmeyer (born 1955), Canadian ice hockey player 
Dave Hoffmeyer (born 1955), American soccer player 
Jesper Hoffmeyer (born 1942), Danish biologist

See also
Hoffmeier

References